The 2nd season of Jak oni śpiewają, the Polish edition of Soapstar Superstar, started on September 8, 2007, and ended on December 15, 2007. It was broadcast by Polsat. Katarzyna Cichopek and Krzysztof Ibisz as the hosts, and the judges were: Edyta Górniak, Elżbieta Zapendowska and Rudi Schuberth.

Stars

Guest Performances

Scores

Red numbers indicate the lowest score for each week.
Green numbers indicate the highest score for each week.
 indicates the star eliminated that week.
 indicates the returning stars that finished in the bottom two.
 indicates the star who has got immunitet

Average Chart

The Best Score (6.0)

Episodes

Week 1

Running order

Week 2
Individual judges scores in charts below (given in parentheses) are listed in this order from left to right: Edyta Górniak, Elżbieta Zapendowska, Rudi Schuberth.

Running order

Week 3
Individual judges scores in charts below (given in parentheses) are listed in this order from left to right: Edyta Górniak, Elżbieta Zapendowska, Rudi Schuberth, Dariusz Jakubowski

Running order

Week 4
Individual judges scores in charts below (given in parentheses) are listed in this order from left to right: Edyta Górniak, Elżbieta Zapendowska, Rudi Schuberth, Piotr Skarga

Running order

Week 5
Individual judges scores in charts below (given in parentheses) are listed in this order from left to right: Edyta Górniak, Elżbieta Zapendowska, Rudi Schuberth, Małgorzata Teodorska

Running order

Week 6
Individual judges scores in charts below (given in parentheses) are listed in this order from left to right: Edyta Górniak, Elżbieta Zapendowska, Rudi Schuberth, Aleksandra Woźniak

Running order

ABBA MIX

Week 7
Individual judges scores in charts below (given in parentheses) are listed in this order from left to right: Edyta Górniak, Elżbieta Zapendowska, Rudi Schuberth, Katarzyna Sowińska

Running order

Week 8
Individual judges scores in charts below (given in parentheses) are listed in this order from left to right: Edyta Górniak, Elżbieta Zapendowska, Rudi Schuberth

Running order

Individual judges scores in charts below (given in parentheses) are listed in this order from left to right: Edyta Górniak, Elżbieta Zapendowska, Rudi Schuberth, Katarzyna Zielińska

Running order

Week 9
Individual judges scores in charts below (given in parentheses) are listed in this order from left to right: Edyta Górniak, Elżbieta Zapendowska, Rudi Schuberth, Jakub Przebidnowski

Running order

Week 10
Individual judges scores in charts below (given in parentheses) are listed in this order from left to right: Edyta Górniak, Elżbieta Zapendowska, Rudi Schuberth, Joanna Trzepiecińska

Running order

Week 11
Individual judges scores in charts below (given in parentheses) are listed in this order from left to right: Edyta Górniak, Elżbieta Zapendowska, Rudi Schuberth

Running order

Individual judges scores in charts below (given in parentheses) are listed in this order from left to right: Edyta Górniak, Elżbieta Zapendowska, Rudi Schuberth, Jakub Tolak

Running order

Week 12
Individual judges scores in charts below (given in parentheses) are listed in this order from left to right: Edyta Górniak, Elżbieta Zapendowska, Rudi Schuberth, Mikołaj Krawczyk

Running order

Week 13
Individual judges scores in charts below (given in parentheses) are listed in this order from left to right: Edyta Górniak, Elżbieta Zapendowska, Rudi Schuberth.

Running order

Individual judges scores in charts below (given in parentheses) are listed in this order from left to right: Edyta Górniak, Elżbieta Zapendowska, Rudi Schuberth, Patricia Kazadi

Running order

Other Performance

Rating Figures

2
2007 Polish television seasons